Duchess Marie Antoinette of Mecklenburg-Schwerin, also Manette (Marie Antoinette Margarethe Mathilde; 28 May 1884 – 26 October 1944) was the second daughter of Duke Paul Frederick of Mecklenburg and the Austrian-born Princess Marie of Windisch-Graetz.

Life

Her brothers and sisters were Duke Paul Friedrich of Mecklenburg (1882–1904), Duchess Maria Luise of Mecklenburg-Schwerin (1883–1883), Duke Heinrich Borwin of Mecklenburg-Schwerin (1885–1942), and Duke Joseph of Mecklenburg-Schwerin (1889–1889). Marie Antoinette had a difficult relationship with her cousin Frederick Francis IV, Grand Duke of Mecklenburg, who regularly had to amortize her debts. So, Marie Antoinette regularly had to sell archaeological artifacts belonging to her mother, excavated in Austria and Carniola, including Hallstatt Archaeological Site in Vače. Some of these objects are still today in Harvard, Oxford and Berlin. She regularly remained  in Bled with her lady in waiting Baroness Antonia Pilars de Pilar. During World War I from 1914 to 1918 they both served in several military hospitals as red cross ladies.

She was German Kaiser Wilhelm II's candidate for a bride for King Alfonso XIII of Spain although he would marry the Kaiser's maternal first cousin, Princess Victoria Eugenie, niece of British King Edward VII.

Honours
  Mecklenburg: Dame's Decoration of the House Order of the Wendish Crown, in Diamonds

Ancestry

References

1884 births
1944 deaths
Duchesses of Mecklenburg-Schwerin
House of Mecklenburg-Schwerin
People from Ludwigslust